The 2003 Armenian Cup was the 12th edition of the Armenian Cup, a football competition. In 2003, the tournament had 17 participants, out of which 6 were reserve teams.

Results

First round

The first legs were played on 15 and 16 March 2003. The second legs were played on 19 and 20 March 2003.

|}

Quarter-finals

The first legs were played on 23 and 24 March 2003. The second legs were played on 6 and 7 April 2003.

|}

Semi-finals

The first legs were played on 17 and 18 May 2003. The second legs were played on 22 and 23 May 2003.

|}

Final

See also
 2003 Armenian Premier League

External links
 2003 Armenian Cup at rsssf.com

Armenian Cup seasons
Armenia
Armenian Cup, 2003